Havilland Point is a point  east of Cape Page forming the east side of the entrance to Vinitsa Cove and the west side of the entrance to Lanchester Bay on the west coast of Graham Land, Antarctica. It was photographed by Hunting Aerosurveys Ltd in 1955–57 and mapped from these photos by the Falkland Islands Dependencies Survey. It was named by the UK Antarctic Place-Names Committee in 1960 for Sir Geoffrey de Havilland, an English pioneer aircraft designer.

References

Headlands of Graham Land
Davis Coast